Ram Karan Sharma was a Sanskrit poet and scholar. He was born in 1927, in Shivapur in the Saran district of Bihar.

Life

He was awarded an MA in Sanskrit and Hindi from Patna University as well as Sahityacharya, Vyakarana Shastri and Vedanta Shastri degrees. He earned a PhD in Linguistics from the University of California, Berkeley, under the guidance of Murray B. Emeneau. Sharma wrote in both Sanskrit and English. Apart from his literary works he has also translated and edited books on Indian medicine, epics, and Puranas.  He also contributed research papers in various seminars, journals and books in the field of Indology.

Death

He died on 18 December 2018 in India.

Awards and honours
He received awards including the Sahitya Akademi Award for Sanskrit in 1989, the Bharatiya Bhasha Parishad Award in 1989, the Delhi Sanskrit Academy Award, and the prestigious Presidential Award. He received the 2005 Krishna Kanta Handique Memorial Award, given in recognition of his contributions to promote the cause of Sanskrit language and literature. In 2004, he was given Vachaspati Puraskar by the K. K. Birla Foundation to honour writers for their work in Sanskrit during the previous ten years for his poetic work Gaganvani.

He was a fellow of the Royal Asiatic Society and Member of the American Oriental Society.

He was vice chancellor of Kameshwar Singh Darbhanga Sanskrit University, Darbhanga, from 1974–1980 and also held the same position at Sampurnanand Sanskrit University, Varanasi, from 1984-1985. He has held visiting professorships at the University of California, Berkeley, the University of Chicago, Columbia University, and the University of Pennsylvania.

Select bibliography

Sanskrit Poetry
 Sandhya
 Patheyasatakam
 Vina
 Kavita
 "sarvamsaha"

Sanskrit novels
 Rayisah
 Sima

Works in English
 Elements of Poetry in the Mahabharata
 Anthology of Medieval Sanskrit Literature (included in volume one of Paniker's Anthology of Medieval Indian Literature)
 Researches in Indian and Buddhist Philosophy: Essays in Honour of Professor Alex Wayman

Other major works
 Śivasahasranāmāṣṭakam
 Sivasukiyam
 Gaganavani
 Caraka Samhita
 Rejuvenative Healthcare in Ayurveda
 Sarvamangala
 Sumanomala
 Dipika
 Bhagavad Gita

Edited works
 Gaṇeśa Purāṇa

Works about him

See also
 List of Indian writers

References

External links
 The Library of Congress Profile

1927 births
2018 deaths
Sanskrit poets
Indian male poets
Recipients of the Sahitya Akademi Award in Sanskrit
Poets from Bihar
Indian Sanskrit scholars
English-language writers from India
Patna University alumni
University of California, Berkeley alumni
Sanskrit writers
Writers from Patna
20th-century Indian poets
20th-century Indian male writers
People from Saran district